Dextran 1,6-alpha-isomaltotriosidase (exo-isomaltotriohydrolase, 1,6-alpha-D-glucan isomaltotriohydrolase) is an enzyme with systematic name 6-alpha-D-glucan isomaltotriohydrolase. This enzyme catalyses the following chemical reaction

 Hydrolysis of (1->6)-alpha-D-glucosidic linkages in dextrans, to remove successive isomaltotriose units from the non-reducing ends of the chains

References

External links 
 

EC 3.2.1